Dotterweich is a surname. Notable people with the surname include:

 Christopher Dotterweich (1896–1969), American cyclist
 Marita Dotterweich, German cross country skier

German-language surnames
Surnames from nicknames